Dance Dance  is a Kannada dance reality show aired on Star Suvarna and streams on Disney+ Hotstar.  It features celebrities as contestants who are paired with professional dancers competing for a cash prize. It premiered on 20 August 2021. The judges of tha show are Prajwal Devaraj, Hariprriya and A.Harsha. The show is hosted by Shine Shetty.

Production 
The show is a competition wherein 12 celebrities are paired with professional dancers and compete against each other. Contestants dance to a different tune, different theme and different styles every week and scores are given by the judges. Each week one couple is eliminated based on Conestants voting and their scores.

Contestants 
A total of 12 celebrities, mostly TV actors, are coupled with dancing partners for the show..

Weekly summary

Weekly scores 
The maximum points awarded for a couple is 30.

Danger Zone:  Irrespective of scores, couples can be subject to eviction based on the contestants votes.

Week 1:  The premiere week had no competition or scores.

Week 11:  Marks were kept secret.

Week 14:  Marks were kept secret.

Week 15:  Marks were kept secret.

  indicates the couple in danger zone who faced eviction.
  indicates that the couple withdrew.
  indicates no points.
  indicates secret marks .

Guests

Reception 
The show gained massive success in the TRP Charts and it became one of the most-watched shows in both rural and urban areas.

References

External links 
 Dance Dance at Disney+ Hotstar

2021 Indian television series debuts
Kannada-language television shows
Star Suvarna original programming
Indian television series based on non-Indian television series
Indian dance television shows
Dance competition television shows
Celebrity reality television series